Hallonstenarna is a group of islands in the Stockholm Archipelago consisting of Västerskäret, Bergskäret, Norrskäret and Långören. The islands are located one nautical mile north of Husarö and are a nature reserve.

Västerskäret used to have a small permanent population. As of 2014, the islands still have holiday homes, although no permanent inhabitants anymore.

References 

Islands of Österåker Municipality
Islands of the Stockholm archipelago
Landforms of Stockholm County